The 1980 British National Track Championships were a series of track cycling competitions held from 19–22 August 1980 at the Leicester Velodrome.

The Championships were held slightly later than usual because of the 1980 Summer Olympics.

Medal summary

Men's Events

Women's Events

References

1980 in British sport
August 1980 sports events in the United Kingdom